The Shreveport Braves were a minor-league baseball team based from Shreveport, Louisiana. The team played from 1968 to 1970 in the Texas League and was affiliated with the Atlanta Braves.

References

 
Defunct Texas League teams
Baseball teams established in 1968
Braves
Professional baseball teams in Louisiana
Atlanta Braves minor league affiliates
1968 establishments in Louisiana
1970 disestablishments in Louisiana
Defunct baseball teams in Louisiana
Baseball teams disestablished in 1970